The Paris-Est Sup is an association of universities and higher education institutions (ComUE) federating two universities and other institutions of higher education and research in the Paris-Est (eastern Paris) region.

Originally organized as a Pôle de recherche et d'enseignement supérieur (PRES) in March 2007, the founding members were University of Marne-la-Vallée and École Nationale des Ponts et Chaussées.

In application of the Law on Higher Education and Research (France), the University of Paris-Est became an association of universities and higher education institutions (ComUE) on March 1, 2015.

Members 
The founding members, according to the statute of the ComUE:
 ESIEE Paris
 École des ponts ParisTech
 École nationale vétérinaire d'Alfort
 Centre national de la recherche scientifique
 Institut français des sciences et technologies des transports, de l'aménagement et des réseaux
 Université Paris-Est Créteil
 Gustave Eiffel University

References

External links 
 University of Paris-Est website

Universities in Paris
2007 establishments in France
Educational institutions established in 2007
Universities and colleges formed by merger in France